Sarijalu (also Romanized as Sārījālū) is a village in Afshar Rural District, in the Central District of Takab County, West Azerbaijan Province, Iran. At the 2006 census, its population was 141, in 28 families.

References 

Populated places in Takab County